Alexander Weir (20 October 1916 – 10 January 2003) was a Scottish professional footballer born in Bathgate, who played as a striker.

He represented Preston North End, Waterford United, Shelbourne, Glenavon, Ballymena United, Glentoran, Hartlepools United, Middlesbrough, Millwall, Tranmere Rovers, Watford, Northampton Town and Margate.

After his playing career, he became manager of Margate, FC Bern, Burma, Hayes, Letchworth Town, Valur, Iceland, Hendon, Hayes and St Albans City.

References

1916 births
2003 deaths
Scottish footballers
Preston North End F.C. players
Waterford F.C. players
Shelbourne F.C. players
Glenavon F.C. players
Ballymena United F.C. players
Glentoran F.C. players
Watford F.C. players
Northampton Town F.C. players
Margate F.C. players
Scottish football managers
Margate F.C. managers
Expatriate football managers in Myanmar
Myanmar national football team managers
Expatriate football managers in Iceland
Iceland national football team managers
Scottish expatriate football managers
FC Bern managers
Hartlepool United F.C. wartime guest players
Middlesbrough F.C. wartime guest players
Millwall F.C. wartime guest players
Tranmere Rovers F.C. wartime guest players
Association football forwards